Not a Box is a children's book by Antoinette Portis.

It was published by Harper Collins Publishers in 2006.

It is graded for Newborn to 6 years old.
It won a 2007 Theodor Seuss Geisel Award Honor and a 2008 Donna Norvell Award.

Sequel
In 2008, Portis released a sequel to this book, Not a Stick.

Bibliography

References

External links
Author's website

2006 children's books
American children's books
American picture books
Books about rabbits and hares
HarperCollins books